The Municipal Corporations Act 1882 (45 & 46 Vict. c.50) is an Act of the Parliament of the United Kingdom. It replaced existing legislation governing municipal boroughs in England and Wales, and gave the corporations powers to make bylaws and to acquire land and buildings. Municipal boroughs continued to be regulated by the Act until their abolition in 1974.  Parts of the Act are still in operation. Sections 190 to 194 were amongst the enactments cited as the Police Acts 1839 to 1893.

Charters and schemes
The Act allowed inhabitant householders of a town to petition the privy council seeking a charter of incorporation as a borough.  Where the petition was successful, a committee of the privy council drew up a "scheme" which described in detail the area of the borough, and the property, powers and duties transferred from existing local authorities such as local boards, sanitary authorities or highway boards. The scheme, together with the charter, described the date of first elections, appointed a returning officer and divided the borough into wards. If one twentieth of the owners or rate payers of the proposed borough objected to the scheme, a local act of parliament had to be passed to bring the borough into existence.

Bylaws
Section 23 of the Act, boroughs were empowered to make bylaws "as to them seem meet for the good rule and government of the Borough, and for the prevention and suppression of nuisances not already punishable in a summary manner by virtue of any act in force throughout the Borough, and may thereby appoint such fines, not exceeding in any case £5, as they may deem necessary for prevention and suppression of offences against the same". Such bylaws gave considerable power to the borough corporation to exert control over various activities and nuisances. Many bylaws made under the 1882 act are still in force, the powers conferred by them now being exercised by the modern local authorities that replaced the municipal boroughs under local government reorganisation.

Buildings and land
The Act allowed corporations to acquire land and buildings for the administration of the borough.  Money could be borrowed to construct town halls, council houses, police stations, judges' lodgings and other buildings required for the conduct of the corporation's business. The maximum term allowed for repayment of such a loan was 30 years, boroughs needing to obtain private acts of parliament to extend the payment period. The corporation could not dispose of land or buildings without the permission of the Local Government Board.

Consolidation of existing legislation
The Act incorporated the various amendments to the Municipal Corporations Act 1835 and several other pieces of legislation.  Among these were the Municipal Franchise Act 1869, which gave the vote to women ratepayers, and the Corrupt Practices (Municipal Elections) Act 1872.

See also
Municipal Corporations Act
Boroughs incorporated in England and Wales 1882–1974

References

External links

UK Legislation 

United Kingdom Acts of Parliament 1882
Local government legislation in England and Wales
Boroughs of the United Kingdom